Gishūmon'in no Tango (宜秋門院丹後, dates unknown) was a waka poet and Japanese noblewoman active in the late Heian period and early Kamakura period. Her work appears in a large number of imperial poetry collections, including Shingoshūi Wakashū, Senzai Wakashū, Shokugosen Wakashū, Gyokuyō Wakashū, Shinsenzai Wakashū, Shinchokusen Wakashū, and others. She is also known as Tango no Zenni (丹後禅尼).

External links 
E-text of her poems in Japanese

Japanese poets
Japanese women poets